is a railway station on the Okinawa Urban Monorail (Yui Rail) in Naha, Okinawa Prefecture, Japan.

Lines 
Okinawa Urban Monorail

Adjacent stations

History
The station opened on 10 August 2003.

External links
  

Railway stations in Japan opened in 2003
Railway stations in Okinawa Prefecture
Naha